The Shrimp on the Barbie, released in Australia as The Boyfriend from Hell, is a 1990 comedy film directed by Michael Gottlieb (under the pseudonym Alan Smithee) and starring Cheech Marin. The title is derived from a line in a 1980s series of popular ads starring Paul Hogan promoting tourism to Australia: "I'll slip an extra shrimp on the barbie for you".

Plot
Australian heiress Alexandra Hobart's (Emma Samms) father has disapproved of every boyfriend she has brought home to meet him, including her burly, life-of-the-party fiancé, Bruce (Vernon Wells). After a disastrous birthday party, Alexandra decides to challenge her father (Terence Cooper) with the worst boyfriend she can find. She hires a down-on-his luck waiter from a Mexican restaurant in Sydney, Australia named Carlos (Cheech Marin) to masquerade as her new boyfriend to persuade her father into allowing her to marry Bruce. Needing the money to save the failing restaurant, Carlos agrees to the ruse; acting loud, belligerent and obnoxious, shocking everyone in the Hobart household and their high-society friends at a party with his crude behavior, warranting unwanted attention from Alex's eccentric cousin, Maggie (Jeanette Cronin) in the process.

After a while however Alex discovers that in spite of his rather crass and unrefined  ways Carlos is actually a very caring and sensitive person and she even finds herself falling for him and starts to see Bruce for the narcissistic fortune hunter he really is. Alex's father, however, doesn't buy the act, and hires a detective to photograph Bruce and Alex's best friend, Dominique (Carole Davis) in a compromising position. Carlos gets wind of the infidelity and, attempting to save Alexandra from being hurt, ends up assaulted by Bruce. Alex outs Bruce and Dominique at a party before racing to the airport to mend fences with Carlos.  Hoping she's not too late, Alex has the plane called back to the airport by her father. Realizing how noble Carlos is, Mr Hobart invests in Carlos' restaurant thereby saving it from closing.

Principal Cast
 Cheech Marin ... Carlos Múñoz 
 Emma Samms ... Alexandra "Alex" Hobart 
 Vernon Wells ... Bruce Woodley, Alex's boyfriend and fiancé  
 Bruce Spence ... Wayne, owner of the Mañana Restaurant  
 Carole Davis ... Dominique, Alex's best friend  
 Terence Cooper ... Sir Ian Hobart, Alex's father  
 Jeanette Cronin ... Maggie Ridley, Alex's cousin  
 Gary McCormick ... Gary Williams, restaurant critic  
 Frank Whitten ... Blue  
 June Bishop ... Lady Irene Hobart, Alex's mother  
 David Argue ... Kevin, Carlos' house mate  
 Bruce Allpress ... Mr. Ridley, Maggie's father  
 Val Lamond ... Mrs. Ridley    
 Richard Hanna ... Nigel, Alex's tennis partner  
 Noel Appleby ... Slim, Mañana chef  
 Eric Liddy ... Edison, the Hobart's butler  
 Kim Buchanan ... Eve Tracey 
 Joel Tobeck ... Lance, bar patron
 Jonathan Coleman (presenter) ... Postman

References

External links
 
 
 

1990 films
1990 comedy films
New Zealand comedy films
Films credited to Alan Smithee
Films directed by Michael Gottlieb
American comedy films
1990s English-language films
1990s American films